Matteo Signani (born 5 June 1979) is an Italian professional boxer who has held the European middleweight title since 2019.

Professional career
Signani made his professional debut on 1 April 2007, scoring a second-round technical knockout (TKO) victory against Christian Nichitilea at the Palasport in Rimini, Italy.

After compiling a record of 4–2–1 (3 KOs), he defeated Carlo De Novellis via unanimous decision (UD) to capture the vacant Italian interim middleweight title on 12 July 2008, in Sequals. Signani challenged for the full Italian title three months later, losing via majority decision (MD) against reigning champion Gaetano Nespro on 31 October in Savignano sul Rubicone. Two judges scored the bout 97–93 in favour of Nespro while the third scored even at 95–95. 

Following three more victories in 2009–Fares Sawaneh via points decision (PTS) in April; Mugurel Sebe by disqualification (DQ) in June; and Abdelouahed Ben Lelly via PTS in December–Signani made a second attempt at the Italian title in a rematch against Nespro on 29 January 2010, at the Seven Sporting Club in Savignano sul Rubicone. Nespro suffered a cut above his eyebrow in the third round, with the referee deeming the cause to be from a legal punch. The bout was allowed to continue after the ringside doctor inspected the cut. The cut reopened in the eighth round, prompting the ringside doctor called a halt to the contest, awarding Signani the Italian title via eighth-round TKO. He made four defences before losing the title against Simone Rotolo via tenth-round TKO on 2 March 2012, in Savignano sul Rubicone. Signani bounced back with three victories before capturing the Italian title for a second time, defeating Stefano Loriga by UD on 27 July 2013, in Castel Volturno, with the judges' scorecards reading 97–89, 97–92 and 95–94. 

After a PTS victory against Goran Milenkovic in a non-title fight in December, Signani faced Istvan Szili for the vacant European Union middleweight title on 2 May 2014, in Gatteo. Both boxers suffered cuts resulting from an accidental clash of heads in the second round. Szili's cut worsened in the third, prompting the referee to call in the ringside doctor. Following an examination, the doctor determined the cut was too severe to allow the fight to continue, bringing a premature end to the contest via technical decision to leave the European Union title vacant. Signani made a second attempt at the title on 6 December, facing Ahmed Rifaie at the Palazzo Congressi in Bellaria. In a fight which saw Signani receive a point deduction in the seventh round for illegal use of the head, he dropped his opponent to the canvas in the twelfth and final round. Signani emerged victorious via UD, with one judge scoring the bout 118–110 while the other two scored it 116–110.

His next fight came against Rafael Sosa Pintos for the vacant WBA Inter-Continental middleweight title on 8 August 2015, in Gatteo. The contest was halted in the eighth round after Pintos suffered a cut from an accidental clash of heads, awarding Signani a TKO victory to capture his third professional title.

He scored a TKO victory against Alexander Bojic in a non-title fight in February 2016, before facing Emanuele Blandamura for the vacant European middleweight title on 3 December at the Palasport in Colleferro. Signani suffered the fifth defeat of his career, losing via split decision (SD) over twelve rounds, with one judge scoring the bout 115–113 in favour of Signani while the other two scored it 117–111 and 115–114 for Blandamura.

After bouncing back with two victories, he defeated Riccardo Lecca via ninth-round TKO on 12 August 2018, capturing the vacant IBF Latino middleweight title in Gatteo.

Three fights later, and in his second attempt, he captured the vacant European title with a SD victory against Gevorg Khatchikian on 11 October 2019, at the PalaTrento in Trento. Two judges scored the bout 116–112 and 115–113 in favour of Signani, while the third judge scored it 115–114 for Khatchikian. In January 2020, it was announced that Signani would make the first defence of his title against Maxime Beaussire on 21 March. However, due to the COVID-19 pandemic, the bout was postponed twice, and eventually took place on 10 October in Caen, France. Signani retained his title with a second-round knockout (KO) victory.

Professional boxing record

References

External links

Living people
1979 births
Sportspeople from the Province of Forlì-Cesena
Italian boxers
Middleweight boxers
European Boxing Union champions
People from Cesena